KJAX (93.5 FM, KJAX Country 93.5) is a radio station broadcasting a country music format. Licensed to Jackson, Wyoming, United States, the station is currently owned by longtime manager Scott Anderson, through licensee Jackson Hole Radio, LLC, and features local news programming and national news from CBS News.

History
The station was assigned the KBHJ call letters on 1998-07-17. On 2000-05-26, the station changed its call sign to the current KJAX.

On January 31, 2013, KJAX moved from 93.3 FM to 93.5 FM.

Ownership
Chaparral Broadcasting sold KJAX and seven other stations to Rich Broadcasting for $3.7 million; the transaction was consummated on April 1, 2013. Rich Broadcasting sold KJAX, three other stations, and four translators to Scott Anderson's Jackson Hold Radio, LLC effective March 16, 2020.

Anderson had managed the stations since 1990 and hosted on air shifts on KMTN while also covering local news.

Anderson, who also has served as the chairperson of the Jackson Hole Chamber of Commerce, was an elected Jackson, Wyoming town councilperson between 1992 and 2006.

References

External links
 Official Website
 

JAX
Country radio stations in the United States